Bruguiera parviflora is a tree in the family Rhizophoraceae. The specific epithet  is from the Latin meaning "small flowers".

Description
The bark is pale grey to pale brown. The wood is sometimes used as charcoal or firewood.

Distribution and habitat
Bruguiera parviflora grows widely in South Asia, Indochina, Malesia and northern Australia. Its habitat is mangrove areas and the species faces similar threats to those generally affecting mangrove habitats such as coastal development, pollution and climate change.

References

External links

parviflora
Trees of the Indian subcontinent
Trees of Indo-China
Trees of Malesia
Trees of Australia
Central Indo-Pacific flora
Mangroves